The Organisation of Islamic Cooperation, the second largest intergovernmental organisation after the United Nations has maintained various organisations and institutions focused on various subjects, including education, social and political. Its organs include subsidiaries, specialized and affiliated institutions, Islamic universities, commercial and non-commercial agencies, and various standing committees that principally plays significant role within the framework of the OIC.

The OIC has also maintained independent commissions, policymaking and decision-making authorities in collaboration with the 57 member states. The OIC Council of Foreign Ministers is the second-highest decision-making body while the Islamic Summit of the Organisation of Islamic Cooperation is the highest decision-making authority. Both are administrated by Secretary General of the Organisation of Islamic Cooperation who is responsible for the implementation of decisions and recommendations made by the member states.

Subsidiary organisations 

The organisations created under the framework of the OIC by the decision-making and policymaking bodies are known as "subsidiary" organisations. All members states became a part of subsidiary by default. However, budget is approved by OIC Council of Foreign Ministers. OIC manages six subsidiaries since its establishment.

Specialized organisations 

A specialized institution or organisation takes activities within the scope of the OIC. The council of foreign ministers are responsible for decisions, however they are implemented by the secretary general likewise subsidiary organs. When a specialized institution is adopted by the OIC, all member states required to sign memorandum than to be part of the institution automatically likewise subsidiary. Any member state has an option to become part of a specialized institution. It manages budge independently. OIC has been maintaining eight specialized institutions since it came into existence.

Affiliated organisations 

Affiliated institutions membership is optional and a government, non-government, company or group within the territories of member states needs to sign memorandum to become a part of the OIC. Their budget is independent than being dependent likewise the budget of the Secretariat General, subsidiary and specialized organs. An Affiliated institutions of the OIC may obtain the status of observer granted by the Council of Foreign Ministers. They may also be voluntarily assisted by the OIC'S subsidiary as well as specialized institutions. The OIC has maintained seventeen affiliated institutions within its scope.

Standing Committees 

In OIC's charter, a standing committee is a body working in the field of critical issues concerning cultural, political, social, religious and human rights issues among others. They are principally focused on human rights mechanism challenges within the member states. OIC has created four standing committees, including one sub-standing committee, Bayt Mal Al Quds Agency.

Other organs 

The OIC has also maintained the Independent Permanent Human Rights Commission, an independent commission that formulate policies on human rights issues in Jerusalem and Palestine. It plays a central role for the protection of Al-Aqsa Mosque, in addition to being observing the Israeli–Palestinian conflict, and Kashmir conflict.

See also 
Secretary General of the Organisation of Islamic Cooperation
Parliamentary Union of the OIC Member States
Islamic Summit of the Organisation of Islamic Cooperation
OIC Council of Foreign Ministers

References 

 
Organisations
Intergovernmental organizations
Lists of organizations
International relations lists

19th century-related lists
20th century-related lists
21st century-related lists